The southern climbing mouse (Rhipidomys austrinus) is a species of rodent in the family Cricetidae. It is found in Argentina and Bolivia in forested valleys and on slopes on the eastern side of the Andes Mountains.

Description
There is a clear demarcation line between the dorsal and ventral pelage; the dorsal fur is dense and varies in colour from greyish brown to orangish brown, while the hairs of the ventral region have dark grey bases and creamy tips. The ears are large and oval in shape and the molars are large. The hind-feet are fairly large with clearly-outlined dark patches on their upper surfaces extending to the bases of the digits. The tail is brown with short hairs along its length and a terminal tuft of hairs.

Distribution and habitat
The southern climbing mouse is found on the eastern slopes of the Andes in South America. Its range extends from Jujuy Province in northwestern Argentina northwards to Santa Cruz Department in central Bolivia and La Paz Department in northwestern Bolivia. Its typical habitat is the Yungas forest that occurs in the densely wooded valleys, but in Argentina it also occurs in montane, transitional and lowland forests. It is nocturnal and a good tree climber, and is sometimes considered a pest in coffee plantations.

Status
The southern climbing mouse is a common species with a wide distribution which seems to have a stable population and has adapted to many habitats, so the International Union for Conservation of Nature has rated its conservation status as being of "least concern".

References

Rhipidomys
Mammals described in 1921
Taxa named by Oldfield Thomas
Taxonomy articles created by Polbot